In archaeology, space archaeology is the research-based study of various human-made items found in space, their interpretation as clues to the adventures humanity has experienced in space, and their preservation as cultural heritage.

It includes launch complexes on Earth, orbital debris, satellites, and objects and structures on other celestial bodies such as the Moon and Mars. It also includes the applied field of cultural resource which evaluates the significance of space sites and objects in terms of national and international preservation laws. Cultural resource looks at what, how and why these artifacts of our recent history should be preserved for future generations.

Cultural heritage

Space tourism could affect archaeological artifacts, for example, on the Moon. The notion that cultural heritage is at stake and requires action to prevent deterioration or destruction is gaining ground. Perhaps artifacts (say, antiquated space stations) could be preserved in "museum orbit". Many such artifacts have been lost because they were not recognized and assessed. Experts assert that continuity and connection to the past are vital elements of survival in the modern world. A model has been suggested for international cooperation based upon Antarctica. Implications for cooperation interest anthropologists as well.

An unexpected ramification of this work is the development of techniques for detecting signs of life or technology on other planets, or extraterrestrial visitation on Earth. One facet of this work is the use of satellites for identifying structures of archeological significance.

Satellites
Satellites are key artifacts in examining human encounters with space over time and the effect we leave through artificial objects. This list includes:
 Vanguard 1 - Launched in 1958, the manmade satellite Vanguard 1 and the upper stage of its launch rocket are the oldest still in orbit. Vanguard 1 lost communication in 1964 but had a few different functions, including the obtention of geodetic measurements and the testing of capabilities.
 Asterix-1 - With the intention of testing the French Diamant Rocket, Asterix-1 was the first French satellite launched into space. Asterix-1 had a very short lived transmission period of two days but remains in orbit and is expected to for centuries.
 Skynet 1A - Providing communication to Middle Eastern forces, Skynet 1A was launched over the Indian Ocean in 1969. No longer in operation, Skynet 1A has an approximate lifetime of more than one million years.
 Kosmos 2222 - With the intended function of identifying ballistic missiles launches, Cosmos-2222 was launched in 1992. With an operation life of four years, Cosmos and its rocket body remain in orbit.

Legal matters

The complexities and ambiguities of international legal structures to deal with these sites as cultural resources leave them vulnerable to impacts in the near future by many varieties of space travel. An outline of the legal situation was made by Harrison Schmitt and Neil Armstrong, two astronauts who walked on the Moon as part of the Apollo program. The governing law on the Moon and other celestial bodies is the Outer Space Treaty of 1967 based upon guidelines from experience in the Antarctic. Another source of ideas is the Law of the Sea. The Outer Space Treaty contains language stating that space objects remain under the jurisdiction of the originating state, and the civil and criminal laws of that state govern private parties both on the Moon and "events leading up to such activity". State parties are to inform the public about the nature and result of their activities.

The later Moon Agreement of 1979 was signed but not ratified by many spacefaring nations. Schmitt and Armstrong believe this lack of ratification relates to disagreement over wording such as "the Moon and its natural resources are the common heritage of mankind", which is taken as possibly excluding private activity, and objections to wording concerning the disruption of the existing environment.

A non-profit organization called For All Moonkind, Inc. is working to establish legal protections for archaeological sites in outer space.  The entirely volunteer group includes space lawyers and policymakers from around the world.  As a result of their efforts, the United Nations Committee on the Peaceful Uses of Outer Space agreed, in January 2018, to consider the creation of a "universal space heritage sites program.".  Having created a discussion around preservation in outer space, For All Moonkind is now focused on preparing drafts of implementing regulations and protocols.

Background and history
During a graduate seminar at New Mexico State University in 1999, Ralph Gibson asked: "Does federal preservation law apply on the moon?" That question led to Gibson's thesis "Lunar Archaeology: The Application of Federal Historic Preservation Law to the Site where Humans first set foot upon the Moon", to a grant from the New Mexico Space Grant Consortium, and to creation of the Lunar Legacy Project.

A manuscript by scientists at NASA and ESA in 2004 raised the possibility of preserving Apollo landing sites for future "astroarcheologists."

In 2006, Dr. O’Leary with New Mexico State Historic Preservation Officer Katherine Slick and the New Mexico Museum of Space History (NMMSH), documented the Apollo 11 Tranquility Base archaeological site on the Moon. Some legal aspects of this work already have surfaced.

Though its mission is not primarily archaeological, the Lunar Reconnaissance Orbiter has imaged all of the Apollo landing sites as well as rediscovering the location of the first Lunokhod 1 rover, lost since 1971 (note: all of the U. S. flags left on the Moon during the Apollo missions were found to still be standing, with the exception of the one left during the Apollo 11 mission, which was blown over during that mission's lift-off from the lunar surface and return to the mission command module in lunar orbit; the degree to which these flags are preserved and intact remains unknown).

Based on an idea by British amateur astronomer Nick Howes, a team of experts has been assembled to try to locate the Lunar Module of the Apollo 10 mission nicknamed "Snoopy", which was released during the mission and is currently thought to be in a heliocentric orbit. The Snoopy mission is encouraged by the 2002 re-sighting of the Apollo 12 third-stage rocket.

The International Space Station Archaeological Project (ISSAP), led by Justin Walsh and Alice Gorman, began in late 2015. As of 2021, the International Space Station has been visited by almost 250 people from 19 countries, and continuously occupied since November 2000. ISSAP is the first large-scale investigation of a space habitat from an archaeological perspective, not only documenting the ISS's material culture, but interpreting its social meaning and significance. The project has been funded by the Australian Research Council, and published research on its methodology and on the creation of visual displays by ISS crew. ISSAP is using new methods to study the space station without being able to visit it directly. These methods include using more than two decades of photographs stored in space agency archives to document life on board the ISS, observing the processes used for handling cargo returned from the ISS, and developing experiments for the crew to perform on the archaeologists' behalf.

On January 14, 2022, ISSAP announced that it had initiated the first archaeological documentation of in situ material culture in a space habitat, the Sampling Quadrangle Assemblages Research Experiment, or SQuARE. NASA astronaut Kayla Barron, working on behalf of ISSAP, placed pieces of adhesive tape to mark the boundaries of six square sample areas located in various areas of ISS. These areas are being documented with photography by the ISS crew on a daily basis for sixty days. SQuARE is sponsored by the ISS National Lab, which has allocated crew time. It is being implemented with the help of Axiom Space and funded by Chapman University.

See also

Space
 Technosignature
 Human presence in space
 Space colonization
 Space station
 Mir
 International Space Station
 Space debris
 Robotic spacecraft
 Space exploration
 Tranquility Base
 Space architecture
 List of Solar System probes

Heritage
 Cultural heritage management
 Historic preservation
 List of archaeological sites beyond national boundaries

Legal documents
 Rescue Agreement
 Outer Space Treaty
 Registration Convention
 Moon Treaty
 Historic Preservation Act
 Law of the Sea
 Antarctic Treaty System

References and notes

Further reading

 Terms of reference for the Space Heritage Task Force] written by Alice Gorman and John B Campbell (2003)
 Beth L. O'Leary, et al.: Archaeology and Heritage of the Human Movement into Space. Springer, Cham 2015, .

External links
 Preserve record of human space exploration] Austin Craig: NMSU news release (2008)
Johns Hopkins Newsletter
From space junk to world heritage listing Sue Lowe for the Sydney Morning Herald (2003)
The Moon: an archaeological treasure trove Leonard David at the Coalition for Space Exploration
Lunar legacy project
Space archaeology wiki An excellent source of links to papers and people
Space Archaeology
Cleaning up space junk may erase history Judy Skatssoon for ABC Science Online (2006)
Moon agreement Various legal documents on line at Lunar Land Management System
International Institute of Space Law
 Testimony of the World Archaeological Congress in 2005 about the National Historic Preservation Act]
Puff video on space tourism
Jeff Bezos' West Texas rocket facilityBlue Origin
NASA Planet Hunter to Search Out Other Earths
Spacejunk: An Archaeological Odyssey featuring an interview with Dr Alice Gorman (aka: Dr Spacejunk).

 The International Space Station Archaeological Project

Historical archaeology
History of spaceflight